2.0 is the fifth studio album by American boy band 98 Degrees. The album was released on May 7, 2013 through eOne Music. It is their first studio album in thirteen years following Revelation (2000), The album was released by eOne Music, making it their first released through an independent record label rather than a major label like Motown or Universal Records. 2.0 debuted at number 65 on the Billboard 200, and number 12 on the Independent Album chart becoming the group's lowest-charting album since their 1997 debut album, 98 Degrees, which debuted at number 145.

Track listing

Charts

References

2013 albums
98 Degrees albums